The WS-125 was an American super-long-range strategic bomber project during the Cold War to develop a nuclear-powered aircraft.

Development
In 1954, the United States Air Force (USAF) issued a weapons system requirement for a nuclear-powered bomber, designated WS-125. In 1956, General Electric teamed up with Convair (X211 program) and Pratt & Whitney with Lockheed in competitive engine/airframe development to address the requirement.

In 1956, the USAF decided that the proposed WS-125 bomber was unfeasible as an operational strategic aircraft. Finally, after spending more than $1 billion, the project was canceled on March 28, 1961.

Powerplants

Two General Electric J87 turbofan engines were successfully powered to nearly full thrust using two shielded reactors. Two experimental engines complete with reactor systems (HTRE-3 and HTRE-1, which was modified and renamed HTRE-2) are located at the EBR-1 facility south of the Idaho National Laboratory.

See also
 List of nuclear-powered aircraft
 
 9M730 Burevestnik (Russia)

References

Butler, Tony (2010). American Secret Projects. Hinckley, England: Midland Publishing. .

Cancelled military aircraft projects of the United States
Military aircraft procurement programs of the United States
Nuclear-powered aircraft
Strategic bombers